John Ogilby (also Ogelby, Oglivie; November 1600 – 4 September 1676) was a Scottish translator, impresario and cartographer. Best known for publishing the first British road atlas, he was also a successful translator, noted for publishing his work in handsome illustrated editions. He also established Ireland's first theatre on Dublin's Werburgh Street.

Life
Ogilby was born in or near Killemeare (Kirriemuir), Scotland in November 1600. When his father was made a prisoner within the jurisdiction of the King's Bench, presumably for bankruptcy or debt, young John supported the family and used some of the money he earned to buy two lottery tickets, which won him a minor prize. This he used to apprentice himself to a dancing master and to obtain his father's release. By further good management of his finances, he was able to buy himself an early completion of his apprenticeship and set up a dancing school of his own. However, a fall while dancing in a masque lamed him for life and ended this career.

Using contacts made among his high-born clients, Ogilby was eventually taken to Ireland by Thomas Wentworth, 1st Earl of Strafford, on his appointment as lord deputy there, and became tutor to his children. Ogilby then went on to establish Ireland's first theatre, the Werburgh Street Theatre, as a consequence of which he was made deputy-Master of the Revels in 1637. For the four years that the theatre was open, it was a great success but it had to be closed as a result of the Irish Rebellion of 1641.

Having narrowly missed being blown up in the castle he was defending, and after being shipwrecked on his homeward journey, Ogilby arrived back in England penniless and without a patron during the closing years of the Civil War. Finding his way on foot to Cambridge, he learned Latin from kindly scholars who had been impressed by his industry. He then ventured to translate Virgil into English verse (1649–1650), which brought him a considerable sum of money. The success of this attempt encouraged Ogilby to learn Greek from David Whitford, who was an usher in the school kept by James Shirley the dramatist.

After his return to London in 1650, he married the widow Christina Hunsdon, who had three children by her earlier marriage. In the following year, he published the first edition of his politicised , illustrated by Francis Cleyn. The next few years were spent in translating and the opening of a publishing business in London. The Restoration of Charles II brought favour back to Ogilby with a commission to help in the arrangements for the coronation in 1660 with the composing of speeches and songs. In that year too he brought out his translation of Homer's Iliad, dedicated to his royal patron. A year later he was again made Master of the Revels in Ireland and he set about the building of a new theatre in Smock Alley, Dublin. The libretto of the musical play Pompey by Katherine Philips, performed at Smock Alley in 1663, credits him as the composer of the tunes.

By 1665 Ogilby had returned to London and published a second, revised edition of The Fables of Aesop, this time illustrated by Wenceslaus Hollar's renowned prints. He had to republish the book in 1668 since his property was destroyed in the Great Fire of 1666. Rebuilding in Whitefriars, he set up a printing press there from which he issued many magnificent books, the most important of which were a series of atlases, with engravings and maps by Hollar and others.

After their publication in 1675, Ogilby died the following year and was buried at St Bride's Church, one of Sir Christopher Wren's new London churches.

Literary reputation
In the years that followed, Ogilby's reputation as a translator was to suffer from the attacks made on him by John Dryden in his satirical MacFlecknoe, and by Alexander Pope in The Dunciad. Whatever the justice of these, it should be borne in mind that Dryden had himself translated the work of Virgil, as Pope had of Homer, so it was in their interest to encourage a preference for their own products. Following their lead, the Scottish philosopher David Hume used Ogilby's work to illustrate the idea that common sense frequently appeals to a "standard of taste" in aesthetic matters: 'Whoever would assert an equality of genius and elegance between Ogilby and Milton, or Bunyan and Addison, would be thought to defend no less an extravagance, than if he had maintained a mole-hill to be as high as Teneriffe, or a pond as extensive as the ocean.' (Hume, "Of the Standard of Taste", originally published in his Four Dissertations (1757).)

Such judgments stuck and it is only recently that Ogilby's work has again been given scholarly attention, particularly his versions of Aesop's Fables. These, according to the short life of him published by Theophilus Cibber, were 'generally confessed to have exceeded whatever hath been done before in that kind'. They renewed interest in the fable as a literary medium and led the way in suggesting their adaptation to the troubled politics of the time. Both Dryden and Pope were as indebted to him in this as Dryden was for certain lines in his own translation of the Aeneid.

Britannia
In 1674 Ogilby had been appointed "His Majesty's Cosmographer and Geographic Printer" to King Charles II and in 1675 issued his Britannia atlas of 1675 which included such details as the configurations of hills and the relative size of towns. One hundred strip road maps are shown, accompanied by a double-sided page of text giving additional advice for the map's use, notes on the towns shown and the alternative pronunciations of their name. Another innovation was Ogilby's scale of one inch to the mile (1:63360). These are marked and numbered on each map, the miles further being divided into furlongs. At that period some of the minor roads used the local mile rather than the standard mile of 1760 standard yards which Ogilby adopted in his atlas, setting the standard for road maps in future. In his 2008 television series Terry Jones suggested that one of the map's purposes might have been to facilitate a Catholic takeover of the kingdom, a hypothesis supported by historian Alan Ereira.

List of 100 plates in Ogilby's 1675 Britannia atlas

London, Acton, Uxbridge, Beaconsfield, High Wycombe, Tetsworth, Oxford, Islip
Islip, Moreton-in-Marsh, Broadway, Pershore, Bromyard, Worcester
Bromyard, Leominster, Presteign, Aberystwyth
London, Ewell, Dorking, Billingshurst, Amberley, Arundel, Chichester
London, Waltham, Hoddesdon, Ware, Royston, Huntingdon, Stilton
Stilton, Stamford, Grantham, Newark, Tuxford
Tuxford, Doncaster, Wentbridge, Tadcaster, York
York, Boroughbridge, Northallerton, Darlington, Durham, Chester-le-Street
Chester-le-Street, Newcastle upon Tyne, Morpeth, Alnwick, Belford, Berwick
London, Hounslow, Maidenhead, Reading, Newbury, Hungerford, Marlborough
Marlborough, Calne, Chippenham, Bristol, Axbridge, Huntspill
London, Acton, Uxbridge, Amersham, Aylesbury, Buckingham, Banbury
Banbury, Stratford, Bromsgrove, Kidderminster, Bridgnorth, Banbury, Camden
London, Brentford, Hounslow, Colnbrook, Slough, Maidenhead, Abingdon
Abingdon, Faringdon, Fairford, Barnsley, Gloucester, Monmouth
Monmouth, Newport, Cardiff, Cowbridge, Aberavon, Burton
Burton, Kidwelly, Haverfordwest, St Davids
London, Southwark, Rochester, Canterbury, Dover
London, Romford, Brentford, Chelmsford, Colchester, Harwich
London, Farningham, Maidstone, Ashford, Hythe
London, High Barnet, St Albans, Dunstable, Stony Stratford, Towcester
Towcester, Daventry, Coventry, Lichfield
Lichfield, Rugeley, Stone, Stableford, Nantwich, Tarporley, Chester
Chester, Denbigh, Conway, Beaumaris, Holyhead
London, Hounslow, Staines, Basingstoke, Andover
Andover, Salisbury, Shaftsbury, Sherborne, Crewkerne
Crewkerne, Honiton, Exeter, Ashburton, Plymouth
Plymouth, Fowey, Tregony, Penzance, Land's End
London, Croydon, East Grinstead, Lewes, Newhaven, Brighton, Shoreham
London, Wandsworth, Cobham, Godalming, Petersfield, Portsmouth
London, Bromley, Sevenoaks, Tonbridge, Rye
Andover, Warminster, Bruton, Bridgwater
Bridgwater, Dulverton, Barnstaple, Torrington, Hatherleigh
Hatherleigh, Camelford, Padstow, St Columb, Truro
Chippenham, Bath, Wells, Marlborough, Devizes, Trowbridge, Wells
Stilton, Peterborough, Spalding, Boston, Sleaford, Lincoln
Darleston, Brewerton, Warrington, Wigan, Preston, Garstang
Garstang, Lancaster, Bolton, Kendal, Penrith, Carlisle
Guildford, Midhurst, Chichester, Midhurst, Petersfield, Winchester
Stony Stratford, Northampton, Market Harborough, Leicester, Loughborough, Derby
Temsford, Stilton, Peterborough, Market Deeping, Sleaford, Lincoln
Lincoln, Barton, Hull, Beverley, Flamborough
Puckeridge, Cambridge, Ely, Downham, King's Lynn
Four shire stone, Chipping Campden, Worcester, Ludlow, Montgomery
High Barnet, Hatfield, Baldock, Biggleswade, St Neots, Oakham
Puckeridge, Newmarket, Thetford, Attleborough, Windham, Norwich
St Albans, Luton, Bedford, Wellingborough, Kettering, Oakham
Oakham, Melton Mowbray, Nottingham, Mansfield, Rotherham, Barnsley
Barnsley, Halifax, Skipton, Middleham, Richmond
Meriden, Birmingham, Bridgnorth, Shrewsbury, Welshpool
Bagshot, Farnham, Alton, Alresford, Southampton, Romsey, Salisbury
Newmarket, Swaffham, Wells, Newmarket, Bury St Edmunds
Basingstoke, Stockbridge, Cranborne, Blandford, Dorchester, Weymouth
Colchester, Ipswich, Saxmundham, Beccles, Yarmouth
Bristol, Chipping Sodbury, Tetbury, Cirencester, Burford, Banbury
Bristol, Chepstow, Monmouth, Hereford, Leominster, Ludlow
Ludlow, Shrewsbury, Whitchurch, Chester
Bristol, Wells, Glastonbury, Taunton, Exeter
Bristol, Gloucester, Tewkesbury, Worcester
Bristol, Wells, Crewkerne, Frampton, Weymouth
Cambridge, St Neots, Northampton, Rugby, Coventry
Carlisle, Jedburgh, Kelso, Berwick
Chester, Wrexham, Newtown, Llanbader
Llanbadardfynydd, Brecon, Cardiff
Dartmouth, Exeter, Tiverton, Minehead
St Davids, Fishguard, Cardigan, Talybont
Talybont, Bala, Ruthin, Holywell
Exeter, Chulmleigh, Ilfracombe, Bideford, Torrington
Exeter, Tavistock, Liskeard, Truro
Gloucester, Cheltenham, Chipping Campden, Warwick, Coventry
Gloucester, Ross-on-Wye, Hereford, Knighton, Montgomery
Hereford, Worcester, Droitwich, Bromsgrove, Coventry, Leicester
Huntingdon, Ely, Bury St Edmunds, Ipswich
Ipswich, Thwaite, Norwich, Cromer
King's Lynn, Thetford, Stowmarket, Harwich
King's Lynn, Gayton, Billingford, Norwich, Yarmouth
Monmouth, Abergavenny, Brecon, Llanbadarnfynydd
Nottingham, Lincoln, Market Rasen, Grimsby
Oxford, Faringdon, Malmesbury, Bristol
Oxford, Buckingham, Bedford, Cambridge
Oxford, Newbury, Basingstoke, Petersfield, Chichester
Oxford, Banbury, Coventry, Ashby-de-la-Zouch, Derby
Oxford, Hungerford, Salisbury, Cranborne, Poole
Presteign, Builth Wells, Llandovery, Carmarthen
Salisbury, Marlborough, Lechlade, Chipping Campden
Tynemouth, Newcastle, Hexham, Haltwhistle, Carlisle
Welshpool, Dolgellau, Caernarvon
York, Ripley, Skipton, Settle, Lancaster
York, Leeds, Rochdale, Manchester, Warrington
Warrington, Chester, Manchester, Stockport, Derby
Carmarthen, Cardigan, Llanbadardfynydd, Aberystwyth
Chelmsford, Sudbury, Bury St Edmunds
Chelmsford, Maldon, Rayleigh, Ingatestone, Billericay, Gravesend, Dover
Exeter, Colyford, Lyme Regis, Bridport, Dorchester, Plymouth, Dartmouth
Ferrybridge, Boroughbridge, Ripon, Barnard Castle, Ferrybridge, Wakefield
Kendal, Ambleside, Cockermouth, Egremont, Cockermouth, Carlisle
Alresford, Winchester, Poole, Christchurch, Southampton, Winchester
Shrewsbury, Wrexham, Holywell, Chester, Flint, Holywell
Whitby, Guisborough, Stockton, Durham, Sunderland, Tynemouth
York, Pickering, Whitby, New Malton, Sherburn, Scarborough

Facsimile editions of Britannia
 Alexander Duckham, 1939 (reduced size)
 Theatrum Orbis Terrarum, 1970, introduction by John B. Harley
 Osprey, Reading, 1971, introduction by Roger Cleeve 
 Old Hall Press, Leeds, 1989, introduction by Dr. Helen Wallis, an edition of 500 copies

See also
 
 John Ogilvy (disambiguation)

References

Further reading

External links

Biography of John Ogilby from MapForum Magazine.

 Reproductions of the Hampshire maps
 Reproductions of the maps
 Ogilby's Britannia (Atlas.4.67.6) in Cambridge Digital Library

1600 births
1676 deaths
17th-century cartographers
17th-century Scottish businesspeople
17th-century translators
Scottish cartographers
Scottish translators
Translators of Homer
Translators of Virgil